Věra Linhartová (born 22 March 1938) is a Czech writer and art historian.

She was born in Brno and studied art history at Jan Evangelista Purkyně University and aesthetics at Charles University in Prague. She worked in the art gallery at Hluboká Castle. From 1962 to 1965, she was involved with the surrealist group in Prague and also contributed to the young writers' journal Tvář. In 1968, Linhartová moved to Paris; since 1969, she has been writing in French.

In 1972, she was the first female juror of the Neustadt International Prize for Literature, known then as Books Abroad. She nominated French author Nathalie Sarraute, but the Prize was awarded to Colombian author Gabriel García Márquez that year.

She studied Japanese in Paris and from 1989 to 1990, she lived in Tokyo on a research grant.

She edited and translated Dada et Surréalisme au Japon (1987).

Linhartová received the Jaroslav Seifert Prize in 1998. In 2010, she received the F. X. Šalda Award and the Tom Stoppard prize for her collection of essays Soustředné kruhy (Collected Circles).

Selected works 
 Meziprůzkum nejblíž uplynulého (Intersurvey of the nearest past), short stories (1964)
 Prostor k rozlišení (Space for differentiation), short stories (1964)
 Rozprava o zdviži (Discourse about a lift), prose (1965)
 Přestořeč (Despitespeech), short stories (1966)
 Chiméra neboli Průřez cibulí, prose (1967)
 Ianus tří tváří (Three-faced Janus), poetry (1993)
 Mes oubliettes (My dungeons) (1998)
 Soustředné kruhy, essays (2011)

References 

1938 births
Living people
Czech women writers
Czech art historians
Czech short story writers
Women art historians
Czech women short story writers
Masaryk University alumni
Charles University alumni
Czech women essayists
Czech women poets
Writers from Brno
20th-century Czech women writers
20th-century Czech poets
21st-century Czech women writers
21st-century Czech writers
21st-century Czech poets
Czechoslovak emigrants to France